Lachlan Lùbanach Maclean, 5th Chief (flourished 1370s) was Chief of Clan Maclean. He was the first Maclean to occupy Castle Duart as the 1st Laird of Duart. His brother, Hector Reaganach Maclean was the progenitor of the Lochbuie Macleans usually MacLaines.

Biography
The date of the beginning of Lachainn Lubanach as fifth chief of MacLean, and successor to his father, Iain Dubh mac Gilliemore Maclean, is not known. It was probably before 1365.

His feuds with the MacDougalls and Camerons were during that period after he became chief. John of Islay, Lord of the Isles, lived until 1386, when he was succeeded by his son Domhnall of Islay, Lord of the Isles. Under Domhnall, as the second Lord of the Isles, Lachlan took due precaution to have his lands confirmed by charter, which occurred in 1390.

He married Mary Mcdonald, the daughter of John of Islay, Lord of the Isles, possible a daughter of John's first marriage.  They had five sons:
Eachuinn Ruadh nan cath Maclean, also known as Red Hector, his successor at Duart.
John Maclean
Lachlan Maclean
Neil Maclean
Somerled Maclean

Lachlan Lubanach lived to a great age. The date of his death is not known, but it must have been before 1405, for on 28 January 1405 at Dundonald, Hector was a witness to a charter confirmed by the king in favour of James Kennedy.

Legacy
Lachlan Lubanach is generally regarded as the first Maclean of Duart because the oldest recorded charter in existence is in his favour. But that does not imply that he was the first possessor.

A fictionalized account of Lachlan's marriage and coming in possession of Duart was given by Fitzroy Maclean in The Isles of The Sea.

Ancestors

References

Year of birth uncertain
1405 deaths
Lachlan Lubanach Maclean of Duart
14th-century Scottish people